The Woman in Black is a 1914 silent film drama directed by Lawrence Marston and starring Lionel Barrymore and Alan Hale. It was produced by the Biograph Company and distributed by the General Film Company.

The film has been preserved in paper print form in the Library of Congress collection.

Cast
Lionel Barrymore – Robert Crane
Alan Hale – Frank Mansfield
Mrs. Lawrence Marston – Zenda, The Woman in Black
Marie Newton – Mary, the Gypsy Girl
Millicent Evans – Stella Everett
Charles Hill Mailes – Mr. Everett
Hector V. Sarno 
Jack Drumier 
Frank Evans

See also
Lionel Barrymore filmography

References

External links
The Woman in Black at IMDb.com

1914 films
American silent feature films
American black-and-white films
Biograph Company films
Silent American drama films
1914 drama films
Films directed by Lawrence Marston
1910s American films